The Gadhiya  are a Hindu community found in the states of Gujarat in  India.

Origin and present circumstances 
The Gadhiya are a well known community found in Gujarat. They speak both the Gujarati dialect and standard Hindi. The Gadhiya are from Leuva Patidar community.

The Gadhiya were traditionally a Kathiyawad community. They are now a community of Business people, and their settlements are found at the end of villages throughout Gujarat.

See also 

Gawaria

References 

Social groups of Uttar Pradesh
Indian castes